Wuthering Heights is a 1953 British TV production of Emily Brontë's classic 1847 novel. It was made because Richard Todd, then at the height of his film popularity, expressed interest in playing Heathcliff and the BBC arranged for an adaptation to be made.

The production was very popular, although no recordings are thought to have survived. Kneale's script was filmed in Australia in 1959.

Plot summary

Cast
 Richard Todd as Heathcliff
 Yvonne Mitchell as Cathy
 William Devlin as Lockwood
 Sydney Bromley as Joseph
 Rene Ray as Isabella (as René Ray)
 Jane Henderson as Ellen
 Robert Brown as Hindley Earnshaw
 Peter Bryant as Edgar Linton
 John Kidd as Dr. Kenneth

References

External links
 

BBC television dramas
1953 television plays
English-language television shows
British television plays
Television shows based on British novels
Films directed by Rudolph Cartier